Doctor Who: The Commentaries  is a radio documentary series focusing on the long-running British television series Doctor Who. Doctor Who: The Commentaries aired on BBC 7 at 6.30 pm on Sundays with a repeat at 12.30 am on Monday mornings. It could be listened to after transmission via the BBC 7 website and via the BBC iPlayer. Doctor Who: The Commentaries aired as part of BBC 7's 7th Dimension strand. Extended versions of each episode were available as podcasts, although music is removed from these.

Broadcast
Doctor Who: The Commentaries premiered on Sunday 6 April 2008, the day after the first episode of Series 4 of Doctor Who, "Partners in Crime", had been broadcast for the first time on BBC One.

Content
Prior to the broadcast of the first episode, Doctor Who: The Commentaries was thought to be a 'recap show' discussing the Doctor Who episode shown the previous day on BBC One in the style of Heroes The Official Radio Show that had aired on BBC 7 in 2007. The show actually comprises edited 30 minute versions of audio commentaries recorded to accompany new episodes of Doctor Who similar to those made available as podcasts on the official Doctor Who website to accompany episodes from Series 2 and Series 3 of Doctor Who and similar to the commentaries on Doctor Who DVD releases. In each episode of Doctor Who: The Commentaries, members of the cast and crew discuss the latest new episode of Doctor Who whilst watching it. For example, Producer Phil Collinson and David Tennant and Catherine Tate, who play respectively the Doctor and Donna Noble in Doctor Who, feature in the first show discussing "Partners in Crime".

Podcast
The full 45 minute audio commentaries for episodes from Series 4 were available as the Doctor Who: The Commentaries'''s podcasts and by pressing the Red Button when watching the Sunday night repeat of the Doctor Who episode on BBC Three. The podcast was available from the BBC 7 website and from the official Doctor Who'' website. Subscriptions to the podcast are available via RSS, iTunes, My Yahoo! and Google Reader.

Episodes

Series 1 (2008) – Doctor Who Season 4

References and footnotes

External links

BBC 7 Homepage
BBC 7's 7th Dimension homepage
Doctor Who: The Commentaries podcast

Works about Doctor Who
BBC Radio 4 Extra programmes
2008 radio programme debuts
Radio series about the media